Albuid-e Yek Nabi (also Romanized as Ālbūʿīd-e Yek Nabī; also known as Alba‘īd-e Yek) is a village in Karkheh Rural District, Hamidiyeh District, Ahvaz County, Khuzestan Province, Iran. At the 2006 census, its population was 428, in 49 families.

References 

Populated places in Ahvaz County